A Hole in the Wall (French: Un trou dans le mur) is a 1950 French comedy film directed by Émile Couzinet and starring André Alerme, Marguerite Pierry and Raymond Galle. It is based on a play by Yves Mirande which had previously been made into a 1930 film of the same title.

Cast
 André Alerme as Campignac  
 Marguerite Pierry as Artémise Corbin  
 Raymond Galle as André de Kerdrec  
 Jacqueline Dor as Lucie  
 Nina Myral as La concierge  
 Gaby Basset as La cliente  
 François Joux as Anatole  
 Palau as L'antiquaire  
 Claudette Falco as La secrétaire

References

Bibliography 
 Goble, Alan. The Complete Index to Literary Sources in Film. Walter de Gruyter, 1999.

External links 
 

1950 comedy films
French comedy films
1950 films
1950s French-language films
Films directed by Émile Couzinet
Remakes of French films
French black-and-white films
1950s French films

fr:Un trou dans le mur